Lacrima di Morro d'Alba is a denominazione di origine controllata red wine that is produced in the province of Ancona, in Marche, Italy.  It is predominantly, if not entirely made from the rare Lacrima grape.  The DOC was created in 1985.

History
According to legend, in 1167 Frederick Barbarossa became a fan of the wine after taking over the Castello di Morro d'Alba following the siege of Ancona.

The Lacrima Grape
Lacrima is an ancient and local grape that is rarely found outside of the town of Morro d'Alba.  The wine is only produced by a handful of estates.  The grape's name (meaning "tear" in Italian) is derived from its tear-like shape, or, alternatively, its thin skin that allows tear-like drops of juice to drip from the grape.

DOC Regulations
According to the DOC laws, Lacrima di Morro d'Alba must contain at least 85% Lacrima.  According to Joseph Bastianich, the wine is a soft, dolcetto-like red wine that some locals think could be important in the future.

References

Italian DOC
Wines of Marche
Province of Ancona